Inangahua is a former parliamentary electorate in the Buller District, which is part of the West Coast region of New Zealand, from 1881 to 1896. The town of Inangahua Junction, which gave the electorate its name, was located in the adjacent  electorate until 1887.

Population centres
The previous electoral redistribution was undertaken in 1875 for the 1875–1876 election. In the six years since, New Zealand's European population had increased by 65%. In the 1881 electoral redistribution, the House of Representatives increased the number of European representatives to 91 (up from 84 since the 1875–76 election). The number of Māori electorates was held at four. The House further decided that electorates should not have more than one representative, which led to 35 new electorates being formed, including Inangahua, and two electorates that had previously been abolished to be recreated. This necessitated a major disruption to existing boundaries.

The original electorate was landlocked. Springs Junction and Reefton were located in the Inangahua electorate, but the township of Inangahua itself was located in the adjacent  electorate. In the 1887 electoral redistribution, the electorate expanded to the north and the west, gained access to the coast, and gained the townships of Inangahua, Owen River (a settlement during the gold rush), and Murchison.

History
Inangahua was represented by six Members of Parliament: Thomas S. Weston from 1881 to 1883 (resigned), Edward Shaw from 1883 to 1884 (retired), Andrew Agnew Stuart Menteath from 1884 to 1887 (elected for Te Aro electorate). The incumbent won the election by a one-vote margin (1003 votes to 1002).

Robert Stout was briefly a member in 1893 (from 8 June to 8 November) after Reeves (a fellow Liberal Party member) resigned when he became bankrupt. The last representative for Inangahua was Patrick O'Regan from 1893 to 1896. When Inangahua was abolished in 1896, O'Regan was elected for Buller.

Members of Parliament
Key

Election results

1893 election

1893 by-election

1890 election

1881 election

Notes

References

Historical electorates of New Zealand
Buller District
1881 establishments in New Zealand
1896 disestablishments in New Zealand
Politics of the West Coast, New Zealand